Rotokas is a North Bougainville language spoken by about 4,320 people on the island of Bougainville, an island located to the east of New Guinea, which is part of Papua New Guinea. According to Allen and Hurd (1963), there are three identified dialects: Central Rotokas ("Rotokas Proper"), Aita Rotokas, and Pipipaia; with a further dialect spoken in Atsilima (Atsinima) village with an unclear status. Central Rotokas is most notable for its extremely small phonemic inventory and for having perhaps the smallest modern alphabet.

Phonology
The Central dialect of Rotokas possesses one of the world's smallest phoneme inventories. (Only the Pirahã language has been claimed to have fewer.) The alphabet consists of twelve letters, representing eleven phonemes. Rotokas has a vowel-length distinction (that is, all vowels have a short and long counterpart) but otherwise lacks distinctive suprasegmental features such as contrastive tone or stress.

Consonants
The consonant inventory embraces the following places of articulation: bilabial, alveolar, and velar, each with a voiced and an unvoiced consonant. The three voiced members of the Central Rotokas dialect consonant phoneme inventory each have wide allophonic variation. Therefore, it is difficult to find a choice of IPA symbols to represent them which is not misleading. The voiceless consonants are straightforward voiceless stop consonants: . Robinson (2006) reports that  has an allophone  in the Aita dialect before . Firchow & Firchow had reported the same for Central Rotokas, though Robinson contests it is not the case anymore due to widespread bilingualism with Tok Pisin.

It is unusual for languages to lack phonemes whose primary allophone is a nasal. Firchow & Firchow (1969) have this to say on the lack of nasal phonemes in the Central Rotokas dialect (which they call Rotokas Proper): "In Rotokas Proper [...] nasals are rarely heard except when a native speaker is trying to imitate a foreigner’s attempt to speak Rotokas. In this case the nasals are used in the mimicry whether they were pronounced by the foreign speaker or not."

Robinson shows that in the Aita dialect of Rotokas there is a three-way distinction required between voiced, voiceless, and nasal consonants. Hence, this dialect has nine consonant phonemes versus six for Rotokas Proper (though no minimal pairs were found between /g/ and /ŋ/). The voiced and nasal consonants in Aita are collapsed in Central Rotokas, i.e. it is possible to predict the Central Rotokas form from the Aita Rotokas form, but it is not possible to predict the Aita form from the Central form. For example,  'day' has /b ~ β/ in both Central and Aita Rotokas, but the second person plural pronoun in Central Rotokas starts with /b ~ β/, /bisi/, but with /m/ in its Aita cognate. Furthermore, Aita was found to have minimal pairs for the voiced labial and alveolar consonants: /buta/ 'time' vs. /muta/ 'taste'. This suggests that the consonant inventory of the ancestor language of Aita and Central Rotokas was more like Aita, and that the small phoneme inventory of Central Rotokas is a more recent innovation.

There does not seem to be any reason for positing phonological manners of articulation (that is, plosive, fricative, nasal stop, tap) in Central Rotokas. Rather, a simple binary distinction of voice is sufficient.

Since a phonemic analysis is primarily concerned with distinctions, not with phonetic details, the symbols for voiced occlusives could be used: stop  for Central Rotokas, and nasal  for Aita dialect. (In the proposed alphabet for Central Rotokas, these are written . However,  would work equally well.) In the chart below, the most frequent allophones are used to represent the phonemes.

Vowels
Vowels may be long (written doubled) or short. It is uncertain whether these represent ten phonemes or five; that is, whether 'long' vowels are distinct speech sounds or mere sequences of two vowels that happen to be the same. The Aita dialect appears not to distinguish length in vowels at all. Other vowel sequences are extremely common, as in the word upiapiepaiveira.

Stress
It does not appear that stress is phonemic, but this is not certain. Words with 2 or 3 syllables are stressed on the initial syllable; those with 4 are stressed on the first and third; and those with 5 or more on the antepenultimate (third-last). This is complicated by long vowels, and not all verbal conjugations follow this pattern.

Grammar
Typologically, Rotokas is a fairly typical verb-final language, with adjectives and demonstrative pronouns preceding the nouns they modify, and postpositions following. Although adverbs are fairly free in their ordering, they tend to precede the verb, as in the following example:

Orthography

The alphabet is perhaps the smallest in use, with only 12 letters of ISO basic Latin alphabet without any diacritics and ligatures. The letters are A E G I K O P R S T U V. T and S both represent the phoneme , written with S before an I and in the name 'Rotokas', and with T elsewhere. The V is sometimes written B.

A simpler alphabet has been proposed, using only A E I O U Ā Ē Ī Ō Ū P T K B D G, (16 letters) using macrons for long vowels and arguably simpler spelling rules. However, it has never been put into common use.

Sample texts

Vocabulary
Selected basic vocabulary items in Rotokas:
{| class="wikitable sortable"
! gloss !! Rotokas
|-
| bird || kokioto
|-
| blood || revasiva
|-
| bone || kerua
|-
| breast || rorooua
|-
| ear || uvareoua
|-
| eat || aio
|-
| egg || takura
|-
| eye || osireito
|-
| fire || tuitui
|-
| give || vate
|-
| go || ava
|-
| ground || rasito
|-
| hair || orui
|-
| hear || uvu
|-
| leg || kokotoa
|-
| louse || iirui
|-
| man || rare pie
|-
| moon || kekira
|-
| name || vaisia
|-
| one || katai
|-
| road, path || raiva
|-
| see || keke
|-
| sky || vuvuiua
|-
| stone || aveke
|-
| sun || ravireo
|-
| tongue || arevuoto
|-
| tooth || reuri
|-
| tree || evaova
|-
| two || erao
|-
| water || uukoa
|-
| woman || avuo
|}

Footnotes

References

 Allen, Jerry & Conard Hurd. Languages of the Bougainville district. 1963. Ukarumpa: Summer Institute of Linguistics.
 Firchow, Irwin B., Jacqueline Firchow & David Akoitai. "Introduction" Vocabulary Rotokas-Pidgin-English, pp vii-xii. 1973. Ukarumpa: Summer Institute of Linguistics. (Brief grammatical sketch.)
 Firchow, Irwin. Rotokas Grammar. 1974. Unpublished manuscript.
 Firchow, Irwin.  "Form and Function of Rotokas Words". 1987. In Language and Linguistics in Melanesia, vol. 15, pp. 5–111.
 Firchow, Irwin B. & Jacqueline. "An abbreviated phonemic inventory". 1969. In Anthropological Linguistics, vol. 11 #9, pp. 271–276.
 Robinson, Stuart. "The Phoneme Inventory of the Aita Dialect of Rotokas". 2006. In Oceanic Linguistics, vol. 45 #1, pp. 206–209.
 Wurm, Stephen & S. Hattori. Language atlas of the Pacific area. 1981. Canberra: Australian Academy of the Humanities.

Further reading 
 
 
 

Languages of the Autonomous Region of Bougainville
North Bougainville languages